Downtown Main Street Historic District may refer to:
Downtown Main Street Historic District (East Hartford, Connecticut)
Downtown Main Street Historic District (North Wilkesboro, North Carolina)

See also
Main Street Historic District (disambiguation)